Frédéric (Fred) Julan (born June 8, 1988) is a French professional boxer. As an amateur, he became the first French boxer to win the Daily News New York Golden Gloves tournament in novice, having won it in both 2013 and 2015. He is also the founder of BoxingCulture.com a support platform for Boxers.

Amateur career 
Julan started boxing at the age of 16 at the ME Boxing Club in Emerainville under the tutelage of Malek Ikhenache who predicted, "If he [Julan] continues to work hard, he will one day go to New York to become world champion."

Julan arrived in New York in September 2012 and began training with Simon Bakinde in pursuit of the and in short order won the 2013 Golden Glover Championship the following April, defeating Jesse Jezina in the finals. Julan won the 178 Novice division again in 2015 (against Patrick Aristhene) making him one of the few boxers to have won the competition more than once.

Professional career 
Julan made his professional debut in 2016 scoring a four-round unanimous decision against Damian Lewis in Queens, New York.

Professional boxing record

Boxing Culture 
In July 2020 Frederic with the help of Nora Ikhenache, (Daughter of Malek Ikhenache) - developed Boxing Culture, a platform dedicated to supporting and accompanying Boxers during their career, along with the Boxing Culture Podcast which he hosts.

References

1988 births
Living people
French male boxers
Light-heavyweight boxers
Southpaw boxers
Boxers from Paris